A Rich Man's Plaything is a 1917 American silent drama film produced and distributed by the Fox Film Corporation. The film starred Valeska Suratt in her final film role. A Rich Man's Plaything is now considered lost. It is one of many silent films that were destroyed in a fire at Fox's film storage facility in Little Ferry, New Jersey in July 1937.

Plot
As described in a film magazine, Marie (Suratt), employed in a New England Cannery, meets "Iron" Lloyd (Martindel), a millionaire financier and tenement owner, whose yacht is cruising off the coast. He poses as a stoker and soon learns from Mary that, if she had the means, she would wage battle against the oppressive tenement lords. As a test, Lloyd, whom she knows as Strange, has his lawyer transfer a fortune to her as a legacy from a lost relative. Mary goes to New York and starts her fight against Lloyd. Ogden Deneau (Dillon), Lloyd's rival in business, associates himself with Mary, pretending to be interested in her work but planning to crush Lloyd. But she has an old score to settle with Deneau and enlists Strange's aid. On the day of the great coup, she arranges to meet Deneau at a country inn, and there exposes him to his wife (Kelly). Returning to the city she learns from Strange that Deneau is bankrupt and that Strange is really Lloyd. She is furious as first, but relents when Lloyd tells her that he was testing her and asks her to start life anew with him.

Cast

 Valeska Suratt - Marie Grandon
 Edward Martindel - "Iron" Lloyd
 John T. Dillon - Ogden Deneau
 Charles Craig - Lawyer Sharp
 Robert Cummings - 'Smash' Regan
 Gladys Kelly - Mrs. Deneau

References

External links

 
 

1917 films
1917 drama films
Fox Film films
Silent American drama films
American silent feature films
American black-and-white films
Films based on short fiction
Films directed by Carl Harbaugh
Lost American films
1917 lost films
Lost drama films
1910s American films
1910s English-language films